Little River Band are a rock band that was formed in Melbourne, Australia, in 1975. The founding members include Beeb Birtles, Graeham Goble, Derek Pellicci and Glenn Shorrock. They have undergone numerous personnel changes, with over 30 members since their formation. The group have released 16 studio albums and have won numerous awards in Australia. In May 2001 the Australasian Performing Right Association (APRA), as part of its 75th anniversary celebrations, named "Cool Change", written by Shorrock, as one of the Top 30 Australian songs of all time. The 1976 line-up of Goble, Shorrock, Birtles, Pellicci, David Briggs and George McArdle, were inducted into the Australian Recording Industry Association (ARIA) Hall of Fame at the 18th Annual ARIA Music Awards of 2004. Little River Band are based in the United States and have no original members since 1998.

APRA Awards 

|-
| rowspan="2"| 1982 || "Reminiscing" – Graeham Goble || Gold Award || 
|-
| "Cool Change" – Glenn Shorrock || Gold Award || 
|-
| 1984 || rowspan="2"| "The Other Guy" - Graeham Goble || Most Played Australasian Popular Work || 
|-
| 1985 || Special Award || 
|-
| 2001 ||| "Cool Change" – Glenn Shorrock || Top 30 Australian songs || 
|}

ARIA Awards 

|-
| 2004 ||| Little River Band || Hall of Fame || 
|}

Australian Rock Music Awards 

|-
|rowspan="14" | 1978 || rowspan="3"| Little River Band || Best Live Rock Act || 
|-
| Best Recording Group || 
|-
| Most Popular Group || 
|-
| rowspan="3"| Glenn Shorrock || Best Male Singer || 
|-
| Best Composer || 
|-
| Rock Hero || 
|-
| Beeb Birtles || Best Composer || 
|-
| David Briggs || Best Guitarist || 
|-
| George McArdle || Best Bassist || 
|-
| Derek Pellicci || Best Drummer || 
|-
| rowspan="2"| Diamantina Cocktail || Best Album Cover || 
|-
| Best Album || 
|-
| Glenn Wheatley || Manager of the Year || 
|-
| "Help Is on Its Way" || Best Single || 
|}

BMI Awards

Grammy Awards 

|-
| 1979 ||| "Lonesome Loser" || Best Pop Vocal Performance by a Duo, Group or Chorus || 
|}

Mo Awards
The Australian Entertainment Mo Awards (commonly known informally as the Mo Awards), were annual Australian entertainment industry awards. They recognise achievements in live entertainment in Australia from 1975 to 2016.
 (wins only)
|-
| 1985
| Little River Band
| Best Rock Group of the Year
| 
|-

TV Week King of Pop Awards 

|-
|rowspan="3" | 1977 || "Help Is on Its Way" || Australian Record of the Year || 
|-
| Little River Band || Best Australian International Performers || 
|-
| Glenn Shorrock || Best Australian Songwriter || 
|-
|rowspan="3" | 1978 || "Reminiscing" || Australian Record of the Year || 
|-
| "Help Is on Its Way" on Paul Hogan Show || Best Australian TV Performer || 
|-
| Sleeper Catcher || Most Popular Australian Album || 
|}

TV Week / Countdown Music Awards 

|-
|rowspan="4" | 1979 || First Under the Wire || Best Australian Album || 
|-
| "Lonesome Loser" || Best Australian Singles || 
|-
|rowspan="2"| Little River Band || Most Outstanding Achievement || 
|-
| Most Popular Group || 
|}

References 

Awards
Lists of awards received by Australian musician
Lists of awards received by musical group